Carodista niphomitra is a moth in the family Lecithoceridae. It is found in Sikkim, India.

References

Moths described in 1931
niphomitra